966 Muschi is a main belt asteroid. It was discovered on 9 November 1921 by the German astronomer Walter Baade out of the Hamburger Sternwarte. Baade named the asteroid after his wife's nickname.

References

External links 
 
 

000966
Discoveries by Walter Baade
Named minor planets
000966
19211109